Ballydehob railway station was on the Schull and Skibbereen Railway in County Cork, Ireland.

History

The station opened on 6 September 1886.

Regular passenger services were withdrawn on 27 January 1947.

References

Further reading 
 

Disused railway stations in County Cork
Railway stations opened in 1886
Railway stations closed in 1947